Luluzinha Teen e sua Turma (lit: Little Lulu Teen and her Gang)  was a manga-style Brazilian comic based on the U.S. comic strip Little Lulu, from Marjorie Henderson Buell.  It was launched in June 2009, a year after the launch of the Monica Teen series, which also adopts the manga style and is also inspired in a popular comic book, Monica's Gang.

In its early days was one of the best-selling comics in Brazil second only to those of Monica Teen. Nevertheless, the comics were canceled in 2015 due to low sales, reaching 65 editions released.

Plot 
The series shows the life of Little Lulu and her friends as 15-year-old high schoolers. The city in which the characters live is called Liberty. The five main protagonists in the story are Lulu, Tubby (Bolinha), Annie, Gloria and Alvin, remodeled as modern teenagers with very different personalities from those the original comics. Lulu is the heroine, always ready to solve cases and mysteries that occur at school or city. Tubby is aspiring rockstar, has a lean physique and dates several girls throughout the series. Annie is fascinated by technology and video games, being considered a geek. Gloria is the stereotype of a preppy obsessed by fashion and shopping, and now is a close friend of Lulu. Alvin is a rebellious preteen who enjoys extreme sports such as skateboarding and surfing.

References

Brazilian comics titles
Little Lulu
Adventure comics
Romance comics
Drama comics
2009 comics debuts
Brazilian comic strips